Alaginella atractus is a species of sea snail, a marine gastropod mollusk in the family Marginellidae, the margin snails.

Description

Distribution
This marine species occurs off Port Alfred, South Africa.

References

 Tomlin, J.R. le B. (1918). Descriptions of three new species of Marginella from South Africa, with a note on M. sutoris Dunker. Journal of Conchology 15: 306–307, pl. 10.
 Turton W.H. (1932). Marine Shells of Port Alfred, S. Africa. Humphrey Milford, London, xvi + 331 pp., 70 pls.

Marginellidae
Gastropods described in 1918